The Bethel Park School District is a midsized, suburban school district in Allegheny County. The district covers the Municipality of Bethel Park which is a suburb of Pittsburgh, as well a portion of the borough of Castle Shannon. According to 2000 federal census data, it serves a resident population of 33,556. In 2009 the residents' per capita income was $25,768, while the median family income was $64,140.

Bethel Park School District operates a total of eight schools. Five elementary schools host grades K-4, and children are assigned to a specific school based on proximity of their home to that school. After 4th grade, all children in Bethel Park go to the same school as the other children in their grade, since the two middle schools and high school are community-wide.

The two middle schools in the district are Neil Armstrong Middle School for grades 5-6 and Independence Middle School for grade 7-8. The high school, Bethel Park High School, is home to grades 9-12.

Additionally there are two Roman Catholic elementary schools for which the school district provides transportation: St. Katharine Drexel and St. Thomas More.

The district borders six other school districts: Baldwin-Whitehall., Keystone Oaks, Mt. Lebanon, Peters Township (Washington County), South Park, and Upper St. Clair

Extracurriculars
The district offers a variety of clubs, activities and sports. There are a large number of sports programs: 27 varsity, 17 junior varsity, 9 freshman and 14 middle school teams, as well as six club sports. Bethel Park School district funds 12 clubs and activities available to students at the middle schools and over 20 at the high school. The high school produces a fall play and spring musical, in which more than 150 students regularly participate.

References

External links
 Bethel Park School District official website

School districts in Allegheny County, Pennsylvania
Education in Pittsburgh area